Marie of Hainaut (1280 – 1354) was the daughter of John II, Count of Holland and Philippa of Luxembourg, and her brother was William I, Count of Hainaut.

Family 
Her nieces by her brother William were Margaret II, Countess of Hainaut who married Louis IV, Holy Roman Emperor; and Philippa of Hainault, Queen of England, who married Edward III and was the mother of nine surviving children including Edward, the Black, Prince of Wales, father of Richard II, and John of Gaunt, father of Henry IV, and founder of the House of Lancaster.

Life 
In 1310 Mary married Louis I, Duke of Bourbon, son of Robert, Count of Clermont and Beatrix of Bourbon. They had eight children,
 Peter I, Duke of Bourbon (1311–1356), killed at the Battle of Poitiers
 Jeanne (1312–1402), married in 1324 Guigues VII, Count of Forez
 Marguerite (1313–1362), married on July 6, 1320 Jean II de Sully, married in 1346 Hutin de Vermeilles
 Marie of Bourbon (1315–1387, Naples), married first in Nicosia in January 1330 Guy of Lusignan (d. 1343), titular Prince of Galilee, married second on September 9, 1347 Robert of Taranto, the titular Latin Emperor. Only her first marriage produced surviving children.
 Philip (1316 – aft. 1327)
 James (1318)
 James I, Count of La Marche (1319 – 1362), killed at the Battle of Brignais
 Beatrice of Bourbon, Queen of Bohemia (1320 – December 23, 1383, Danvillers), married first at Vincennes in 1334 John of Luxembourg, King of Bohemia as his second wife, married herself second c. 1347 Eudes II of Grancey (d. 1389)

Ancestry

Sources

Sources

1280 births
1354 deaths
Avesnes family
Duchesses of Bourbon
13th-century French people
13th-century French women
14th-century French people
14th-century French women